Alexei Vorontsov (born January 18, 1986) is a Kazakhstani professional ice hockey forward who currently plays for Barys Astana of the Kontinental Hockey League (KHL). He participated at the 2010 IIHF World Championship as a member of the Kazakhstan men's national ice hockey team.

References

External links

1986 births
Sportspeople from Oskemen
Barys Nur-Sultan players
Kazakhstani ice hockey left wingers
Living people
Universiade medalists in ice hockey
Universiade silver medalists for Kazakhstan
Competitors at the 2013 Winter Universiade